The ecclesiastical confiscations of Mendizábal, more often referred to simply as la Desamortización in Spanish, were a set of decrees that resulted in the expropriation and privatisation of monastic properties in Spain from 1835 to 1837.

The legislation was promulgated by Juan Álvarez Mendizábal, who was briefly prime minister under Queen regent Maria Christina during the reign of the two-year-old Queen Isabel II of Spain. The aims of the legislation were varied. Some of its impulses were fostered by the anticlerical liberal factions engaged in a civil war with Carlist and other reactionary forces. The government wished to use the land to encourage the enterprises of small-land owning middle class, since much of the land was thought of as underused by monastic orders. The government, which refused to compensate the church for the properties, saw this as a source of income. Finally, wealthy noble and other families took advantage of the legislation to increase their holdings.

Ultimately, the desamortización led to the vacating of most of the ancient monasteries in Spain, which had been occupied by the various convent orders for centuries. Some of the expropriations were reversed in subsequent decades, as happened at Santo Domingo de Silos, but these re-establishments were relatively few.  Some of the secularised monasteries are in a reasonably good state of preservation, for example the Valldemossa Charterhouse; others are ruined, such as San Pedro de Arlanza.

See also
 Spanish confiscation
Anticlericalism in Spain
Confiscations of Madoz

References
Josefina Bello, Frailes, Intendentes y Políticos; Los Bienes Nacionales 1835-1850. Santillana, S.A. Taurus, 1997, 
Joseph Harrison, An economic history of modern Spain, Page 26, Manchester University Press ND, 1978. , 
Francisco Tomás y Valiente, El marco político de la desamortización en España. Ariel 1989 
Germán Rueda Hernánz, La desamortización en España: un balance, 1766–1924, Arco Libros. 1997. .

Christian monasteries in Spain
19th century in Spain
Political history of Spain
1835 in Spain
1836 in Spain
1837 in Spain